Chess competitions at the 2022 South American Games in Asuncion, Paraguay are scheduled to be held between October 8 and 9, 2022 at the Polideportivo Urbano

Medal summary

Medal table

Medalists

Men

Women

Mixed

Participation
Twelve nations will participate in chess of the 2022 South American Games.

References

Chess
South American Games
2022